The Effect is a 2012 play by the British playwright Lucy Prebble. It received its world premiere at the Royal National Theatre's Cottesloe Theatre in November 2012, and starred Billie Piper and Jonjo O'Neill.

Production
The Effect, a The National Theatre and Headlong co-production, opened at the National's Cottesloe Theatre on 13 November 2012. Directed by Rupert Goold, who also directed Prebble's previous play ENRON, the cast featured Billie Piper as Connie, Jonjo O'Neill as Tristan, Anastasia Hille as Dr James and Tom Goodman-Hill as Toby. Further creatives were Designer Miriam Buether, Lighting Designer Jon Clark, Musical Direction Sarah Angliss, Sound Designer Christopher Shutt and Projection Designer Jon Driscoll.

Synopsis
Tristan and Connie agree to volunteer in a clinical drug trial. Tristan and Connie start to fall in love. What they are not sure of is whether their newfound passion is instinctive or a byproduct of dopamine. Thus, Tristan and Connie manage to throw the trial off-course, much to the frustration of the clinicians involved.

Reception

Charles Spencer from The Telegraph wrote that "Lucy Prebble is a playwright blessed with an exceptionally fine mind [. . .] the play struck me as being both wise and sane, raising more questions than it answers, to be sure, but that seems a sign of integrity in a work dealing with such a complex subject. But what makes The Effect so special, is that as well as being a play of ideas, it is also deeply moving, both in its depiction of the giddy wonder of love, and also in its account of the terrifying wasteland of depression itself [. . . ] The Effect is an astonishingly rich and rewarding play, as intelligent as it is deeply felt." Paul Taylor from The Independent observed “This four-hander brings the author's agile wit, intellectual penetration and a fresh, deeply affecting empathy to bear on a fundamentally much more complex topic than finance: brain chemistry and what it can – and cannot – tell us about the causes of severe depression and the experience of being in love … This is a provocative and challenging play … it ends in edgy gesture of good sense that made me feel like cheering.”

Awards and nominations

Revival 
A revival of the play was planned at the Boulevard Theatre London in March 2020 with Anthony Neilson directing and featuring Eric Kofi Abrefa as Tristan, Christine Entwisle as Dr James, Tim McMullan as Toby and Kate O'Flynn as Connie. Due to the COVID-19 pandemic in the United Kingdom the play has been postponed.

References 

2012 plays